Reebal Fahed Adel Dahamshi (Arabic: ريبال فهد عدل الدهامشة, Hebrew: ריבאל פהד עדל דהאמשה; born 8 June 2002) is a professional footballer who plays as a forward for Hapoel Bnei Zalafa. Born in Israel, he represents the Palestine national team.

Career statistics

International

References

2002 births
Living people
Palestinian footballers
Israeli footballers
Association football forwards
Palestine international footballers
F.C. Tzeirei Kafr Kanna players
Hilal Al-Quds Club players
Hapoel Bnei Zalafa F.C. players
Palestine youth international footballers